A velocipede is a human-powered land vehicle with one or more wheels. The most common type of velocipede today is the bicycle.

The term was probably first coined by Karl von Drais in French as vélocipède for the French translation of his advertising leaflet for his version of the Laufmaschine, also now called a 'dandy horse', which he had developed in 1817. It is ultimately derived from the Latin velox, veloc- 'swift' + pes, ped- 'foot'. The term 'velocipede' is today mainly used as a collective term for the different forerunners of the monowheel, the unicycle, the bicycle, the dicycle, the tricycle and the quadracycle developed between 1817 and 1880. It refers especially to the forerunner of the modern bicycle that was propelled, like a modern tricycle, by cranks, i.e. pedals, attached to the front axle before the invention of geared chains and belt and shaft drives powering the rear.

History 
Among the early velocipedes there were designs with one, two, three, four, and even five wheels. Some two-wheeled designs had pedals mounted on the front wheel, while three- and four-wheeled designs sometimes used treadles and levers to drive the rear wheels.

The earliest usable and much-copied velocipede was created by the German Karl Drais and called a Laufmaschine (German for "running machine"), which he first rode on June 12, 1817. He obtained a patent in January 1818. This was the world's first balance bicycle and quickly became popular in both the United Kingdom and France, where it was sometimes called a draisine (German and English), draisienne (French), a vélocipède (French), a swiftwalker, a dandy horse (as it was very popular among dandies) or a Hobby horse. It was made entirely of wood and metal and despite the condition of the roads at the time was sometimes ridden for long distances.

It was almost 40 years until "velocipede" came into common usage as a generic term, with the launch of the first pedal-equipped bicycle, developed by Pierre Michaux, Pierre Lallement and the Olivier brothers in the 1860s. The Michaux company was the first to mass-produce the velocipede, from 1857 to 1871. That French design was sometimes called the boneshaker, since it was also made entirely of wood, then later with metal tires. That in combination with the cobblestone roads of the day made for an extremely uncomfortable ride. These velocipedes also became a fad, and indoor riding academies, similar to roller rinks, could be found in large cities. In 1891 L'Industrie Vélocipédique (Cycling Industry) magazine described 'La Société Parisienne de constructions Velo' as 'the oldest velocipede manufacturer in France', having been founded in 1876 by M. Reynard, and awarded the 'Diploma of honour' at the Exposition Universelle (1878) (World's Fair).

During the 1870s advances in metallurgy led to the development of the first all-metal velocipedes. The pedals were still attached directly to the front wheel, which became larger and larger as makers realised that the larger the wheel, the farther you could travel with one rotation of the pedals. Solid rubber tires and the long spokes of the large front wheel provided a much smoother ride than its predecessor. This type of velocipede was the first one to be called a bicycle ("two wheel"), and its shape led to the nickname penny-farthing in the United Kingdom. They enjoyed a great popularity among young men in the 1880s who could afford them. 

While young men were risking their necks on the high wheels, ladies and dignified gentlemen such as doctors and clergymen of the 1880s favoured the less risky tricycle. Many innovations for tricycles eventually found their way into the automobile, such as rack and pinion steering, the differential, and band brakes, the forerunners to drum brakes.

On May 8, 1888 in Washington D.C, Matthew A. Cherry patented new contributions to a velocipede design that could seat up to 3 people including an overhead awning.

Boneshaker 

Boneshaker (or bone-shaker) is a name used from about 1869 up to the present time to refer to the first type of true bicycle with pedals, which was called velocipede by its manufacturers. "Boneshaker" refers to the extremely uncomfortable ride, which was caused by the stiff wrought-iron frame and wooden wheels surrounded by tires made of iron.

History 

This type of bicycle was invented in the 1860s in France and first manufactured by the Michaux company from 1867 to 1869 – the time of the first bicycle craze, and copied by many others during that time. It fell out of favor after the summer of 1869, and was replaced in 1870 with the type of bicycle called "ordinary", "high-wheel", or "penny-farthing".

Few original boneshakers exist today, most having been melted for scrap metal during World War I. Those that do surface from time to time command high prices, typically up to about $5,000 US.

Design 
The construction of the boneshaker was similar to the dandy horse: wooden wheels with iron tires and a framework of wrought iron. As the name implies it was extremely uncomfortable, but the discomfort was somewhat ameliorated by a long flat spring that supported the saddle and absorbed many of the shocks from rough road surfaces. The boneshaker also had a brakea metal lever that pressed a wooden pad against the rear wheel. The front wheel axle ran in lubricated bronze bearings, and some had small lubrication tanks that would wick oil from soaked lamb's wool into the bearings to help them run smoothly. Like the High Wheel bicycles that became popular later in the 19th century, boneshakers were front-wheel drive, but in comparison they had smaller wheels (only about 1 m), and were heavy, with a lightweight model weighing  or more.

In railroad use 

Railroads in North America often made use of a three-wheeled handcar designed to be operated by a single person, which came to be known as a "railway velocipede" or "railroad velocipede".  The three-wheel hand-pump rail car's invention is credited to George S. Sheffield of Three Rivers, Michigan.   Legend has it that because of inadequate train service to his home, Sheffield built a simple three-wheel car, allowing him to commute  between home and work without having to walk.  While so traveling one evening, he discovered a break in the track, and flagged down a night freight train, thus preventing a possible accident. The railroad rewarded his efforts by bankrolling his invention.  George Sheffield obtained the patent for his device in 1879, calling it a "velocipede hand car."    Originally manufactured by G.S. Sheffield & Co. and later manufactured by Fairbanks, Morse & Company, the Sheffield velocipede remained in use up to World War II.

Patents 
Velocipede (reissued as RE7972)
U.S. Patent 382351A VBLOGIPEDE (Lifetime, Expired)

See also 
 Outline of cycling

References

External links 
 
 

 19th century picture of a Velocipede supposedly outrunning a horse
 Musée McCord Museum Gallery "A Race on the IceBicycles v. Skates"
 The Boneshaker. Retrieved 28 June 2010.

1817 introductions
Cycle types
Vehicles introduced in the 1810s